The MLS Golden Boot (currently commercially termed "Audi Golden Boot") has been awarded since the 2005 season to Major League Soccer's regular–season leading scorer.  The award replaced the MLS Scoring Champion Award that was awarded since the league's inception in 1996.

1996–2004
Prior to 2005 MLS used a point system that awarded two points for a goal and one point for an assist to give the MLS Scoring Champion Award.

2005–present
Since 2005 Major League Soccer has awarded the MLS Golden Boot to the player who has scored the most goals outright, with ties being broken by assists.

References

Golden Boot
United States